Dindar Najman is an Iraqi Kurdish politician who is displacement and migration minister in the second cabinet of Nouri Maliki. He is one of the leaders of the Kurdistan Islamic union.

Career
Najman is a lawmaker and one of the leaders of the Patriotic Union of Kurdistan led by Jalal Talabani. He was appointed displacement and migration minister to the cabinet headed by Nouri Maliki in 2010. In the cabinet, Duski is part of the Kurdish Alliance.

References

Living people
Government ministers of Iraq
Patriotic Union of Kurdistan politicians
Year of birth missing (living people)